In fashion, style analysis is often offered in conjunction with color analysis by professionals such as image consultants or style consultants. A style consultation differs from a color analysis as it considers the body shape of an individual and results in the recommendation of specific shapes and styles of clothes that will suit the individual's body shape, style preferences, work environment and leisure pursuits.

References 

 BRENDA'S WARDROBE COMPANION:A Guide for Getting Dressed from the Inside Out by Brenda Kinsel 

Fashion